Kardhiq is a village in the former Cepo commune, Gjirokastër County, Albania. At the 2015 local government reform it became part of the municipality Gjirokastër. The village is inhabited by Muslim Albanians and an Orthodox Albanian population. Kardhiq Castle is located near the village.

Name
The toponyn Kardhiq is used for several places in Albania. It is found in several places of the Balkans, in the form of Gardik, Gardiki (in Greece), Gradec. The toponym is of Slavic origin and stems from a word for "castle".

History

In late 14th century and early 15th century the Kardhiq Castle was built by the noble Albanian family of Zenebishi. On 15 March 1812, the village was destroyed and 730 of its Muslim Albanian inhabitants were massacred by Greek forces of Thanasis Vagias serving the local Ottoman Albanian ruler Ali Pasha. The later ordered the massacre due to a long-standing vendetta he had with the village.

Notable people 
Hasan Dosti, jurist and Balli Kombëtar leader
Çerçiz Topulli, Albanian revolutionary and guerrilla fighter involved in the national movement against the Ottoman occupation.

References 

Populated places in Gjirokastër
Villages in Gjirokastër County